Ricky Smith is a former rugby league footballer who played as a . He played at representative level for Ireland.

International honours
Smith won three caps for Ireland in 1995.

References

Ireland national rugby league team players
Living people
Rugby league centres
Year of birth missing (living people)